William Barre may refer to:

W. J. Barre (William Joseph Barre, 1830–1867), Irish architect 
William de la Barre (1849–1936), Austrian-born American civil engineer
William Vincent Barré ( 1760–1829), French translator